Boris Laustroer (born 24 May 1970) is a German former professional tennis player.

Laustroer, a native of Oelde, competed on the professional tour in the early 1990s. He had a best singles ranking of 203 in the world and won an ATP Challenger tournament in Singapore in 1990, beating Sander Groen in the final.

ATP Challenger titles

Singles: (1)

References

External links
 
 

1970 births
Living people
German male tennis players
West German male tennis players
Tennis people from North Rhine-Westphalia